Ashmunella harrisi is a species of air-breathing land snail, a terrestrial pulmonate gastropod mollusk in the family Polygyridae.

Type Specimens

Holotype
The holotype was collected on April 11, 1975 from limestone talus on the north-facing wall of a canyon indenting the East side of Goat Mountain. It is deposited at the Academy of Natural Sciences of Drexel University ANSP 340724.

Paratypes
Paratypes are deposited at

 Academy of Natural Sciences of Drexel University ANSP 340725  
 DelMNH 106682  
 DMNH 4535  
 National Museum of Natural History USNM 758527  
 University of Texas at El Paso Biodiversity Collections UTEP:ES:3139 and UTEP:ES:4413

Distribution
Known from two canyons on the east side of Goat Mountain in the southeastern part of the San Andres Mountains.

Etymology
The species is named in honor of Dr. Arthur H. Harris, who first collected the species.

References

Polygyridae
Gastropods described in 1977